Charming Garden is a Home Ownership Scheme and Private Sector Participation Scheme court in Mong Kok, Kowloon, Hong Kong, built on reclaimed land of the old Yau Ma Tei Typhoon Shelter. It was jointly developed by Hong Kong Housing Authority and Chevalier Group. It comprises 18 blocks completed in 1998.

Charming Garden is in Primary One Admission (POA) School Net 31. Within the school net are multiple aided schools (operated independently but funded with government money) and Jordan Road Government Primary School.

References

External links

 Yu, Pui-kwan, Robin, "A study on quasi-public space in large scale private residential development, case in Hong Kong", University of Hong Kong, 2007

Home Ownership Scheme
Private Sector Participation Scheme
Residential buildings completed in 1998
Yau Ma Tei
Tai Kok Tsui